Phenacodontidae is an extinct family of large herbivorous mammals traditionally placed in the “wastebasket taxon” Condylarthra, which may instead represent early-stage perissodactyls. They lived in the Paleocene and Eocene epochs (about 60–50 million years ago) and their fossil remains have been found in North America and Europe.

Description
These animals had a variety of body sizes, and could be as small as domestic cats (Tetraclaenodon and Ectocion) and as large as sheep (Phenacodus). The skull of phenacodontids is long and narrow, and equipped with a small braincase.

The skeleton of phenacodontids show several primitive characteristics (the long and heavy tail for example) but also a number of advanced, Perissodactyla-like adaptations: Their long legs, for example, had five fingers, but the first finger showed a clear reduction, and in some forms (like Phenacodus) the fifth finger was reduced as well.

Some species had tapir-like adaptations suggestive of the presence of a short proboscis or a strong prehensile lip.

The teeth of phenacodontids, particularly in the latter forms, were quite specialized: The molars and premolars were equipped with low cusps that sometimes joined in ridges, similar to the condition found in some perissodactyls. Some forms, like Meniscotherium, had enlarged ridges. This adaptation is unusual for mammals as old as phenacodontids. Only a few other archaic mammals possessed teeth with similar structures, such as Pleuraspidotherium.

Evolution
The phenacodontids evolved in the middle Paleocene in North America. Early forms were usually small; Tetraclaenodon, for example, was the size of a fox. Later forms were much larger and invaded Europe, although they never became as plentiful as in North America.

Towards the beginning of the Eocene these animals slowly disappeared from the fossil record. Only a few forms survived into the middle Eocene: the Phenacodus in Europe and North America, Almogaver in Europe and Ectocion in North America.

An exception to the scarcity of Eocene phenacodontids is the dog-sized genus Meniscotherium, whose fossils are very abundant.

Classification
Phenacodontids have classically been included in the large group Condylarthra, now considered polyphyletic. In particular, the genus Phenacodus is often illustrated as a typical example of a "condylarth", due to the remarkable abundance of fossil remains.

 Subfamily Phenacodontinae Cope, 1881
 Genus Tetraclaenodon Scott, 1893
Tetraclaenodon floverianus Cope, 1890
Tetraclaenodon puercensis (Cope, 1881)
Tetraclaenodon septentrionalis Thewissen, 1990
 Genus Copecion Gingerich, 1989
Copecion brachypternus (Cope, 1882)
Copecion davisi Gingerich, 1989
 Genus Ectocion Cope, 1882
Ectocion cedrus Thewissen, 1990
Ectocion collinus Russell, 1929
Ectocion ignotum Novacek et al., 1991
Ectocion major (Patteron & West, 1973)
Ectocion mediotuber Thewissen, 1990
Ectocion osbornianus (Cope, 1882)
Ectocion parvus Granger, 1915
Ectocion superstes Granger, 1915
 Genus Phenacodus Cope, 1873
Phenacodus bisonensis Gazin, 1956
Phenacodus condali (Crusafont i Villalta, 1955)
Phenacodus grangeri Simpson, 1935
Phenacodus intermedius Granger, 1915
Phenacodus lemoinei Thewissen, 1990
Phenacodus magnus Thewissen, 1990
Phenacodus matthewi Simpson, 1835
Phenacodus primaevus Cope, 1873
Phenacodus teilhardi Simpson, 1929
Phenacodus trilobatus Cope, 1882
Phenacodus vortmani (Cope, 1880)
 Genus Lophocion Wang and Tong 1997
Lophocion asiaticus Wang and Tong 1997
Lophocion grangeri Bai et al. 2019
 Subfamiliy Meniscotheriinae Cope, 1882
 Genus Meniscotherium Cope, 1874
Meniscotherium chamense Cope, 1874
Meniscotherium tapiacitum Cope, 1882
 Genus Orthaspidotherium Lemoine, 1878
Orthaspidotherium edwardsi Lemoine, 1878

Some phylogenetic analyses have revealed effective relationships between the various groups of "condylarths". One phylogeny suggests there may be close correlations between a clade containing proboscideans, hyracoids, perissodactyls and phenacodontids and another clade with Microhyus and the macroscelids<ref name="tabuceetal2001"/. The clade including these forms would be analogous to the clade Taxeopoda, proposed in 1998.<ref name="archibald1998"/

According to more recent views, instead of a monophyletic clade, the Condylarths are better understood as an evolutionary grade that lead to the true ungulates. Indeed, recent phylogenetic studies confirm that phenacodonts were most closely related to modern odd-toed ungulates.

Paleobiology
The specialized teeth found in at least some phenacodontids seem to indicate a primary herbivorous lifestyle. The shape of the legs indicated that some phenacodontids (like Phenacodus) were swift runners.

See also
 Radinskya, a basal perissodactyl from the Paleocene of China

Notes

References
 
 

Condylarths
Paleocene mammals
Eocene mammals
Paleocene first appearances
Eocene extinctions
Prehistoric mammal families